Taj Fort Aguada Resort & Spa, formerly Fort Aguada Beach Resort, is built on the crescent of the beach at Sinquerim, in Goa, India. The hotel is part of the chain hotels of Taj Group of Hotels. 

The Exotica is the "most plush" of the Taj group's four hotels in Goa, the 143 room property overlooks the beach and features amenities ranging form cricket grounds to an Ayurvedic spa. The Hotel stands in a 56-acre beachfront property

History
The hotel opened in 1974 as the Taj Fort Aguada Beach Resort & Spa at the site of the historic Portuguese Fort Aguada. For many years, it was the sole first class hotel in Goa.

Gallery

References

External links 

 Homepage

Hotels in Goa
Benaulim
Buildings and structures in South Goa district
Taj Hotels Resorts and Palaces
Hotels established in 1974